The 1st Armored Brigade is a military formation of the Republic of Korea Army. The brigade is subordinated to the V Corps.

History 
The headquarters of the 1st Armored Brigade Command was used by the 7th Infantry Division, USFK (Camp Kaiser). Camp Kaiser withdrew and the brigade took over the site on 25 May 1977.

Organization 
Headquarters:
Headquarters Company
Air Defense Artillery Battery (K30)
Armored Engineer Company
Chemical Company
Armored Reconnaissance Company (K1E1,K200)
Signal Company
Support Company
Intelligence Company
5th Armored Battalion (K1E1)
15th Armored Battalion (K1E1)
19th Armored Battalion (K1E1)
105th Mechanized Infantry Battalion (K200A1)
138th Mechanized Infantry Battalion (K200A1)
628th Artillery Battalion (K55A1)
888th Artillery Battalion (K9A1)

References 

Military units and formations established in 1968
Pocheon